David Wright (born 1 May 1980) is an English former professional footballer and manager who was most recently Assistant First-Team Coach of League One club Milton Keynes Dons.

Wright began his playing career at Crewe Alexandra, where he helped the club to promotion to the First Division in 2002–03 following the club's relegation to the Second Division in the previous season. He went on the make over 200 league appearances for the club. He also played over 100 league games for Ipswich Town between 2007 and 2010, as well as representing Wigan Athletic, Norwich City on loan, Crystal Palace, Gillingham on loan and Colchester United.

In 2013, Wright took on his first coaching role at the Ipswich Town Academy, before taking on a similar role at Colchester while also managing Isthmian League side Maldon & Tiptree in 2015. He left the Jammers in December 2015 to team up with new Colchester United manager Kevin Keen as his assistant. After Keen left by mutual consent in April 2016, Wright took temporary charge of Colchester's penultimate league game of the 2015–16 season. He was then appointed manager of the under-18 team, before moving to Norwich City to take up the same role.

Club career

Crewe Alexandra
Born in Warrington, Wright rose through the youth team ranks at Crewe Alexandra, making his first-team debut for the Railwaymen in August 1997 as a late substitute during a 2–0 away win against Norwich City. He made three First Division appearances during the 1997–98 season, and established himself in the following season, making 20 league appearances and a substitute appearance in the League Cup. He scored his first goal during the 1998–99 season when he netted the opening goal in a 5–1 thrashing of West Bromwich Albion on 5 April 1999.

Wright went on to make 213 league appearances for Crewe in his seven years with the club. On the back of relegation to the Second Division in 2002, Wright helped the club gain immediate promotion back to Division One after finishing in the runners-up spot.

Wigan Athletic
In June 2004, Wright signed for Wigan Athletic for an undisclosed fee in the region of £250,000. Making 31 Championship appearances in the 2004–05 season, he again experienced promotion, on this occasion to the Premier League. However, Wright found himself out of favour in his second season, and having not made a league appearance, he joined Norwich City on a one-month loan deal in November 2005.

Wright made five appearances for the Canaries before returning to Wigan. Following his loan spell, Wright made his Premier League bow for the Latics, replacing Leighton Baines at left back after 66 minutes in what ended as a 3–0 home defeat to Blackburn Rovers on 31 December 2005. He made one further appearance in the 2005–06 season, starting in an away game at Birmingham City two days after his last appearance. Wigan were defeated 2–0 as Wright played the full 90 minutes.

The 2006–07 season saw Wright make 12 Premier League appearances. Wright played his final game for Wigan on New Year's Day 2007, featuring as a substitute in another 3–0 home defeat to Blackburn.

Ipswich Town
Ipswich Town signed Wright from Wigan in January 2007 on a three-and-a-half year deal. He made his Town debut in a 1–0 defeat to Sunderland at the Stadium of Light on 13 January, and in only his second appearance for the club, Wright found himself sent off for handling the ball in Ipswich's 3–2 win over local rivals Colchester United. His only goal of the campaign came in the East Anglian derby against his former side Norwich City, the equalising goal in a 1–1 draw on 22 April.

Wright featured regularly for Town in the 2007–08 season, ending the campaign with 43 appearances in all competitions and scoring two goals; against Bristol City in a 6–0 thrashing and against West Bromwich Albion on New Year's Day 2008.

During the 2008–09 season, although Wright was born in Warrington, England, Scotland and former Ipswich Town manager George Burley was considering selecting Wright for the Scotland national team due to his grandparents Scottish ancestry. However, this never came to fruition. Another solid season saw Wright rack up another 36 appearances and score the decisive goal in a 2–1 win against Nottingham Forest on 18 February 2009.

Wright scored the only goal of the game in a match against Derby County on 31 October 2009 to halt manager Roy Keane's winless run of 15 games, in what was the team's first win of the season. Following this, Wright made a further 21 appearances in the 2009–10 season, bringing his total appearance figure for Ipswich to 128 matches.

Crystal Palace
Former Scotland manager George Burley signed Wright for his Crystal Palace side on a two-year contract in June 2010. He made his debut for the Eagles on 14 August 2010 as Palace fell to a 1–0 defeat away at Barnsley. Wright made 29 appearances during the 2010–11 season and made a further 25 appearances in his second season.

Wright played just three games for Palace during the 2012–13 season before joining League Two club Gillingham in September 2012, on loan for one month. He made seven appearances during the spell, and although the club attempted to extend his loan, the deal fell through as it was not confirmed before a 17:00 GMT transfer deadline on 22 November 2012. Following this loan spell, Wright did not make any further appearances for Crystal Palace before leaving the club.

Colchester United
On 25 January 2013, Wright signed for League One club Colchester United on a free transfer. He made his debut for the club in a 2–0 win over Walsall the following day, a win which marked the first points in nine games for the U's.

After ending his first season with Colchester with 12 League One appearances, Wright held down a regular role during the 2013–14 season and scored his first professional goal in four-and-a-half years in Colchester's 4–2 defeat to Wolverhampton Wanderers at Molineux on 25 March 2014. He signed a new one-year contract with the club on 3 July 2014. After making only three substitute appearances in the 2014–15 season, Wright was released from his Colchester contract by mutual consent on 26 November 2014.

Coaching career

Ipswich Town Academy
While playing for Colchester United, during the summer of 2013, Wright was appointed Academy coach at nearby Ipswich Town, where he coached players in the under-14, under-15 and under-16 age groups. He continued in his role following his contractual release from Colchester in November 2014.

Maldon & Tiptree
He returned to the coaching set-up at Colchester in June 2015, linking up with the club's academy to work under John McGreal. In a dual-coaching role, the move also saw him named as manager of Isthmian League Division One North side Maldon & Tiptree in a development link-up between the two clubs. His role would see him act as a full-time coach with Colchester, while managing Maldon & Tiptree on a part-time basis. Wright said "I'm very excited about the opportunity and I'm really looking forward to it".

Colchester United
After taking charge of Maldon & Tiptree for 25 games, resulting in ten league wins, five draws and ten defeats, Wright was appointed assistant manager to Kevin Keen at Colchester United on 21 December 2015 following Tony Humes exit from the club. Wright left the Jammers in 14th position in the table. After Keen left by mutual consent on 26 April 2016, Wright was named as caretaker manager for the penultimate game of the 2015–16 season following Colchester's relegation from League One three days earlier. In his first game in charge, he led the club to a 2–2 draw against Barnsley at Oakwell. After Colchester took the lead in the first-half, two Barnsley goals second-half turned the match in the home side's favour, but an equaliser in the eighth minute of stoppage time from Tom Lapslie rescued a point for Wright and his team. John McGreal was named permanent manager on 4 May ahead of Colchester's final game of the season. Wright was appointed in a new role in May 2016, becoming manager of Colchester's under-18 team.

Norwich City U18/U23
In November 2016, Wright left Colchester to take up the role of under-18s manager at Norwich City. In 2019, he was appointed manager of the club's U23 side.

Milton Keynes Dons
On 17 August 2021, Wright joined League One club Milton Keynes Dons as assistant first team coach, working under new manager Liam Manning. Wright departed the club alongside Manning on 11 December 2022.

Career statistics

Playing statistics

Managerial statistics

Honours
Crewe Alexandra
2002–03 Football League Second Division runner-up (level 3)

Wigan Athletic
2004–05 Football League Championship runner-up (level 2)

All honours referenced by:

References

External links

1980 births
Living people
Footballers from Warrington
English footballers
Association football defenders
Association football midfielders
Crewe Alexandra F.C. players
Wigan Athletic F.C. players
Norwich City F.C. players
Ipswich Town F.C. players
Crystal Palace F.C. players
Gillingham F.C. players
Colchester United F.C. players
English Football League players
Premier League players
English football managers
Isthmian League managers
Maldon & Tiptree F.C. managers
Colchester United F.C. managers
Colchester United F.C. non-playing staff
Norwich City F.C. non-playing staff
Milton Keynes Dons F.C. non-playing staff
Association football coaches